The Paul Simon Anthology is the fourth greatest hits compilation album by American singer-songwriter Paul Simon, which was released in 1993. It featured one previously unreleased track, "Thelma".

Track listing 

CD 1
"The Sound of Silence" – 3:06
"Cecilia" – 2:54
"El Condor Pasa" – 3:06
"The Boxer" – 5:08
"Mrs. Robinson" – 3:54
"Bridge over Troubled Water" – 4:49
"Me and Julio Down by the Schoolyard" – 2:42
"Peace Like a River" – 3:16
"Mother and Child Reunion" – 2:59
"American Tune" – 3:44
"Loves Me Like a Rock" – 3:18
"Kodachrome" – 3:30
"Gone at Last" – 3:29
"Still Crazy After All These Years" (Live) – 3:50
"Something So Right" – 4:30
"50 Ways to Leave Your Lover" – 3:06
"Slip Slidin' Away" – 4:44
"Late in the Evening" – 3:55
"Hearts and Bones" – 5:38
"Rene and Georgette Magritte with Their Dog after the War" – 3:42

CD 2
"The Boy in the Bubble" – 4:01
"Graceland" – 4:50
"Under African Skies" – 3:37
"That was Your Mother" – 2:53
"Diamonds on the Soles of Her Shoes" – 5:48
"You Can Call Me Al" – 4:42
"Homeless" – 3:50
"Spirit Voices" – 3:58
"The Obvious Child" – 4:10
"Can't Run But" – 3:36
"Thelma" – 4:16
"Further to Fly" – 5:35
"She Moves On" – 4:57
"Born at the Right Time" (Live) – 5:08
"The Cool, Cool River" (Live) – 5:44
"The Sound of Silence" (Live) – 5:41

Personnel

Musicians

Ademola Adepoju – Pedal steel guitar
Francisco Aguabella – Congas
Artur Andres – Percussion
Mingo Araújo – Castanet, Conga, Drums, Percussion, Surdo, Talking Drum
Ken Ascher – Organ
Patti Austin – Vocals (Background)
Cyro Baptista – Percussion
Barry Beckett – Keyboard
Adrian Belew – Guitar
Beloba – Percussion
Hal Blaine – Conga, Drums, Percussion
Michael Brecker – Saxophone
Randy Brecker – Piccolo trumpet, Trumpet
Briz – Vocals (Background)
Bob Bushnell – Bass guitar
J.J. Cale – Guitar
Pete Carr – Guitar
Anthony Carrillo – Bongos
Fred Carter Jr. – Guitar
Tony Cedras – Keyboard
Dom Chacal – Bata, Bongos, Conga, Gourd, Percussion
Wells Christy – Synclavier
Kim Cissel – Trombone
Bob Cranshaw – Bass guitar
Jorge Ferreira da Silva – Percussion
Wilson DasNeves – Cowbell, Percussion
The Dixie Hummingbirds – Vocal Group
Jerry Douglas – Dobro
Pete Drake – Dobro, Pedal steel guitar
Gordon Edwards – Bass guitar
Don Elliott – Vibraphone
The Everly Brothers – Vocals
Jon Faddis – Trumpet
Babacar Faye – Percussion
Deborah Feingold – Cover Photo
Alex Foster – Alto saxophone
Steve Gadd – Drums
Alexander Gafa – Guitar
Eric Gale – Electric guitar
Earl Gardner – Trumpet
Art Garfunkel – Vocals
Russell George – Bass guitar
Florence Gnimagnon – Vocals (Background)
Morris Goldberg – Penny Whistle
Gordinho – Surdo
Al Gorgoni – Guitar
Bobby Gregg – Drums
Winston Grennan – Drums
Dave Grusin – Horn Arrangements
The Harptones – Vocal Arrangement, Vocals (Background)
Roger Hawkins – Drums
Giovanni Hidalgo – Conga
Neville Hinds – Organ
David Hood – Bass guitar
Cissy Houston – Vocals
Johnny Hoyt – Saxophone
Anthony Jackson – Bass guitar, Contrabass guitar
Jackie Jackson – Bass guitar
Alonzo Johnson – Bass
Jimmy Johnson – Guitar
Remy Kabocka – Talking Drum
Vusi Khumalo – Drums
Larry Knechtel – Keyboards, Piano, Bass
Ladysmith Black Mambazo – Collaboration, Vocals
Denzil Laing – Percussion
Tony Levin – Bass guitar
Ralph MacDonald – Percussion
Makhaya Mahlangu – Percussion
Mike Mainieri – Marimba, Vibraphone
Marçalzinho – Percussion
Hugh Masekela – Flugelhorn
Mazzola – Arranger, Chicote, Rhythm Production
Charlie McCoy – Harmonica
Hugh McCracken – Electric Guitar, Acoustic Guitar
Victor Montanez – Drums
Airto Moreira – Percussion
Sidinho Moreira – Bongos, Conga, Percussion, Sordu, Tambourine
Forere Motloheloa – Accordion, composer
Rob Mounsey – Synthesizer
Isaac Mtshali – Drums
Youssou N'Dour – Percussion
Milton Nascimento – Lyricist, Vocals
Del Newman – String Arrangements
Vincent Nguini – Guitar, Claves, Bass Guitar, Guitar Arrangements
The Oak Ridge Boys – Vocal Group
Joe Osborn – Bass guitar
Dean Parks – Hi String Guitar
Greg Phillinganes – Synthesizer
Chikapa "Ray" Phiri – Arranger, Guitar, Guitar Arrangements
Leonard Pickett – Tenor-saxophone
Raphael Rabello – Guitar
Décio Ramos – Percussion
Sherman Robertson – Guitar
Linda Ronstadt – Vocals
Alan Rubin – Trumpet
Alton Rubin – Drums
Dave Rubin – Washboard
Armand Sabal-Lecco – Bass guitar
Robert Sabino – Piano
Paulinho Santos – Percussion
Paulo Sérgio Santos – Chicote
Bobby Scott – Piano
John Selolwane – Guitar
Joseph Shabalala – Composer, lyricist, Vocals
Paul Simon – Arranger, composer, Guitar, lyricist, producer, Synthesizer, Vocals, Acoustic Guitar, Electric Guitar, Vocals (Background)
Valerie Simpson – Vocals (Background)
Von Eva Sims – Vocals
Phoebe Snow – Vocals, Vocals (Background)
Pedro Sorongo – Percussion, Scraper
David Spinozza – Guitar
Renelle Stafford – Vocals
Rigo Star – Guitar
Grady Tate – Drums
Richard Tee – Fender Rhodes, Keyboards, Piano, Synthesizer
Assane Thaim – Percussion
John Tropea – Guitar (Electric)
Deidre Tuck – Vocals
Uakti – Percussion
Naná Vasconcelos – Conga, Gourd, Percussion, Triangle
Kim Wilson – Harmonica

Production
Greg Calbi – Mastering
Art Garfunkel – Producer
Gregg Geller – Consultant
Philip Glass – Liner Notes
Roy Halee – Engineer, Musical Supervision, producer
Jeri Heiden – Art Direction, Design
Kevin Howlett – Liner Notes
Bob Johnston – Producer
Quincy Jones – Arranger
Jorge Milchberg – Arranger
Muscle Shoals – Rhythm Section, producer
Phil Ramone – Producer, Recording Supervision
Jacob Sam – Composer
Paul Samwell-Smith – Producer
Steven Strassman – Assistant Engineer
Peter Thwaites – Assistant Engineer
Russ Titelman – Producer
Richard Travali – Assistant Engineer
Paul Zollo – Liner Notes

Charts

Certifications

References

Paul Simon compilation albums
1993 compilation albums